Pill Heath is a hamlet in the civil parish of Tangley situated in the North Wessex Downs Area of Outstanding Natural Beauty in the Test Valley district of Hampshire, England. According to the Post Office the population of the hamlet at the 2011 Census was in the civil parish of Hurstbourne Tarrant.   Its nearest town is Andover, which lies approximately 4.7 miles (7.6 km) south-east from the hamlet.

Villages in Hampshire
Test Valley